This list ranks tallest completed structures (buildings and towers) in Republika Srpska by height.

See also
List of tallest buildings in Balkans
List of tallest buildings in Bosnia and Herzegovina
List of tallest buildings in Croatia
List of tallest buildings in North Macedonia
List of tallest buildings in Slovenia

Republika Srpska